Northern Emberá, also known as West Embera and Cholo, is the largest Embera language. It is spoken largely in Colombia, but is also the principal language of the Darién Gap in Panama.The Emberá language is divided into two branches: Northern and Southern. Two prominent Northern groups are Emberá Darien and Katio. The Katio language is spoken by 10,000 - 20,000 people, whose literacy rate is at 1%. The Darien Emberá language is spoken by 9,000-10,000 people.

Classification 
Northern Emberá is a dialect that comes from Embera which is part of the Chocó family. The Chocó family includes two languages, Waunana and the group of the Emberá dialects. The Emberá dialects form a dialectal continuum with two geographically defined subgroups: the Northern branch contains the Proper Northern Emberá (referred to as ‘Northern Emberá’ in Mortensen 1999) and the Katío dialect.

History 
The Waunanas and Emberás are the last remnants of a larger group of Pre-Columbian ethnic groups, such as the Orominas, the Chancos, the Guarras, the Burrumías, that were diminished during the Colonial period. Genetic findings show that the speakers of Chocó languages are genetically differentiated from the Chibcha speaking tribes of Northern Colombia and cluster with the Orinoquian and Amazonian indigenous populations. Waunana and Emberá share a large number of cognates (estimated to 50% by Loewen 1960: 12), which provide evidence for their common origin. However, there is no clear evidence in terms of a sufficient number of cognates for a common origin of Chocó with other South or Central American families.

Geographic Distribution 
The majority of the Katio language are found along the Upper Sinu, San Jorge, San Pedro and Murri Rivers of northwestern Colombia with a few living in Panama. The majority of Darien Embera speakers live in Panama with approximately 2,000 living in northwestern Colombia on the Atrato River.

Phonology

Consonants

Vowels

Grammar

Phoneme Inventory 
Katio's phoneme inventory contains 16 consonants (p, t, dɮ , t͡ʃʼ, k, b, d, g, s, h, m, n, r, u) and 6 vowels, both oral and nasal (a, e, i, o, u, ɨ). Darien Embera's phoneme inventory contains 17 consonants (p, t, k, b, d, dɮ, t͡ʃʼ, g, s, h, z, r, t, w, j) and 6 vowels, oral and nasal (a, e, i, o, u, ɨ).

Syntax 
The Chocó languages show the properties of head-final languages: OV order, postpositions, embedded verbs preceding matrix verbs. At the clausal level, the basic order is SOV with some flexibility used for discourse purposes.

Noun phrase 
The neutral order in the noun phrase is: [DP D [QP [AP [NP N] A ] Q ]. Determiners (D) precede the noun (N), while adjectives (A) and quantifiers (Q) are postnominal in the neutral configuration. Determiners include demonstratives, some indexical elements, as well as the definite determiner. The definite article is also used for the nominalization of non-nominal constituents.

Verbs 
Verb clusters are linearized in a head-final pattern. The auxiliary follows the lexical verb, and the matrix verb follows the embedded verb. With non-verbal predicates, the auxiliary follows the predicative element. For example:

Reduplication 
Reduplication is very productive and may be total, or partial. It is frequently used for the derivation of adjectives, and verbs. Verbs formed through reduplication have an iterative or durative interpretation. Reduplication is used to lessen the intensity of both verbs and adjectives.

Nasalization 
In Chocó languages, the nasal feature spreads throughout a nasal morpheme, affecting vowels, sonorants and voiced obstruents. In Northern Emberá, regressive nasalization is reported to appear only with some speakers. The domain of nasalization is blocked by voiceless obstruents as well as by the multiple vibrant /r/.

Numbers 
Number is marked on nouns and verbs. The singular is generally unmarked, while the plural is overtly marked. Within the noun phrase, plural is marked on the head, which is either a noun or a pronoun. Nominal plural is encoded by the morpheme -rã in Emberá. The plural suffix is highly integrated to the verbal inflection such that its form depends on tense; Northern Emberá -ta ‘PL’ in present/habitual and -da ‘PL’ in the past tense.

Tense 
Northern Emberá and Katio make a clear distinction (immediate vs. unspecified temporal distance) in those tenses in which the event time point does not coincide with the speech time point (past and future) For example:

Orthography 
Northern Embera is written in two similar orthographies: one is used in Panama, and the other is used in Colombia.

Example of Words

Numbers

Further reading
 Aguirre Licht, Daniel 2009. ‘Choco languages’, in Brown, Keith and Sarah Ogilvie (eds.). Concise Encyclopedia of Languages of the World. Amsterdam: Elsevier,
 Binder, Ronald E. 1977. ‘Thematic linkage in Waunana discourse’. In Robert E. Longacre and Frances Woods (eds.), Discourse grammar: Studies in indigenous languages of Colombia, Panama, and Ecuador, part 2. Dallas: Summer Institute of Linguistics and the University of Texas at Arlington,
 Hajek, John 2013. ‘Vowel nasalization’, in Dryer, Matthew S. and Martin Haspelmath (eds.). The World Atlas of Language Structures Online. Leipzig: Max Planck Institute for Evolutionary Anthropology. Available online at: http://wals.info/chapter/10
 Reich, David, Nick Patterson, Desmond Campbell, Arti Tandon, Stéphane Mazieres, Nicolas Ray, Maria V. Parra, Winston Rojas, Constanza Duque, Natalia Mesa, et al. 2012 ‘Reconstructing Native American population history’, Nature

Notes

Choco languages
Languages of Colombia
Languages of Panama